The Afters is an American Christian pop rock band founded by Joshua Havens and Matt Fuqua. Havens and Fuqua first worked together in a Starbucks coffee shop in Mesquite, Texas, where they performed songs for customers, before deciding to form a band. They were initially joined by Brad Wigg from the same Starbucks, and drummer Michael Burden and performed under the name Blisse.  When Burden left the band Marc Dodd, from the Mesquite Starbucks, stepped in. Their song "Never Going Back to OK" was the most-played song on R&R magazine's Christian CHR chart for 2008.

History 
As a precursor to Blisse, Josh performed several shows around Dallas with his band The Screaming Mimes that included Charlton Parker, who later formed Deaf Pedestrians, and Hans Grumbein. While Brad was a founding member of Blisse, he took time away from the band to perform with his own blues project, playing lead guitar. Shows at the Door in Deep Ellum were filled in by Dallas bassist Eric Kitchens and bassist/filmmaker Niko Red Star.

Under the name Blisse, the band recorded a six-song EP in 2000. From this they made enough money to cut their first album, When the World Is Wonderful, which was released independently in 2001. This album contains songs also released on their major label debut album I Wish We All Could Win. In 2002 they released a live concert DVD filmed at a local Dallas club called The Door.

The band changed its name after discovering that another "Blisse" already existed. Settling on "The Afters", they continued to play local clubs in the Dallas area. They were eventually discovered by INO Records and signed to a four-record deal. After this, word of the band got to Epic Records, who signed the band to a deal for mainstream promotion and distribution. Their first major label album, I Wish We All Could Win, was released on February 22, 2005. The first single from the album was "Beautiful Love", written by Josh Havens about a time when his wife was abroad doing humanitarian aid. The single's music video led The Afters to a 2005 MTVu "Streaming Woodie" award. In addition, "Beautiful Love" became the theme song for the MTV show, 8th and Ocean about the life of female and male fashion models living in Miami, Florida. The song was also featured in the 2006 film, Just My Luck. The song "Until the World" was the theme song for the American drama television series that aired on the ABC Family Network Beautiful People.

In an update posted on their official website, the band went into the studio in August 2006 to start recording their second album, Never Going Back to OK. It was originally scheduled to be released on December 26, 2007, as per a post on their MySpace blog, but was ultimately delayed and released on February 26, 2008.

The first single from the album, the title track "Never Going Back to OK" was premiered on October 16, 2007, on Total Axxess. It was also released as a streaming file on The Afters' MySpace page on November 10, 2007. The song hit the R&R magazine charts in December 2007. It reached No. 1 on the R&R CHR chart in March 2008 and R&R magazine ranked it as the most played song on U.S. Christian CHR radio in 2008.

In spring of 2008, the band began their own headlining tour along with Falling Up, Ruth, and Everyday Sunday.

The Afters stated in their Twitter account that they started recording their next album on October 27, 2009. The album, called Light Up the Sky, was released on September 14, 2010. The album's first single, the title track, has reached No. 1 on Billboard's Christian CHR radio, and also received an appearance on MTV's The Hills.

In January 2011 The Afters joined the Rock And Worship Roadshow national tour headlined by MercyMe. Light Up the Sky was produced by Dan Muckala.

The Afters announced a new album to be released on April 17, 2012. A month later, they released a new single entitled "Life is Beautiful" on iTunes, in which the song was part of the soundtrack for the movie October Baby. On February 19, 2013, a new single, "Every Good Thing", became available on iTunes. The new album's title was Life is Beautiful.

On August 28, 2015, the band released "Live on Forever", the lead single from Live on Forever, their fifth studio album set for release in late 2016 on Fair Trade Records.

In 2018, "Well Done" appeared on the Billboard 100, followed by "I Will Fear No More" on October 19, 2018. Both songs were advanced releases for The Beginning & Everything After, their greatest hits album released on November 2, 2018, and for Fear No More, their sixth studio album released on May 31, 2019.

On December 3, 2021, the band released their first live album, Where Heaven Touches Earth: Live at The Grove which was recorded in Arizona.

Band members 
Current members
 Joshua Havens - lead vocals, keys and guitars
 Matt Fuqua - vocals and guitars
 Dan Ostebo - bass guitar

Former members
 Brad Wigg - guitars, bass guitar and vocals
 Michael Burden - drums
 Marc Dodd - drums
 Niko Red Star - bass guitar
 Jordan Mohilowski - drums

Discography

Studio albums

Compilation albums

Independent albums 
 When the World Is Wonderful (2001) (as Blisse)

Live albums and DVDs 
 Live @ the Door (2002) (as Blisse)
 Where Heaven Touches Earth: Live at The Grove (2021)

EPs 
 Never Going Back to OK - EP (2008)

Singles

Awards and nominations

GMA Dove Awards

Notes

References

External links 
 
 The Afters - I Wish We All Could Win

Christian rock groups from Texas
Columbia Records artists
Musical groups from Dallas
Fair Trade Services artists
Musical groups established in 1999
1999 establishments in Texas